Gerard Michael Kelly (18 September 1908 – January qtr. 1983) was an English footballer who scored 67 goals in 216 league appearances in a 12-year career in the Football League from 1927 to 1939. He played for Sunderland, Nelson, Huddersfield Town, Charlton Athletic, Chester, Port Vale, and Southampton.

Career
Kelly left Hylton Colliery at the age of 19 to sign for Sunderland in 1927. He never made the first team at Roker Park and the following year joined Nelson. He scored 11 goals in 38 appearances in the 1928–29 season, bagging his first goal in the Football League in a 5–1 win over Southport at Haig Avenue on 8 September. He scored four goals in nine Third Division North games in the 1929–30 campaign, before departing Seedhill.

He signed with Huddersfield Town, and scored seven goals in 14 First Division games in the 1929–30 season. He scored eight goals in 20 appearances for the "Terriers" in the 1930–31 campaign, including a hat-trick against Manchester United at Old Trafford on 10 September. However, he played just four games at Leeds Road at the start of the 1931–32 season, before signing with Charlton Athletic, and seeing out the 1931–32 season with six goals in 20 Second Division games for the "Addicks".

He then left The Valley and joined Chester. The "Seals" finished fourth in the Third Division North in 1932–33, before posting tenth and third-place finishes in 1933–34 and 1934–35 He scored 27 goals in 73 league appearances in his time at Sealand Road. He joined Third Division North side Port Vale for a "substantial fee" in June 1936. Starting off firmly in the first 11, his place slipped away over the 1936–37 season and he went on to score twice in 21 league and cup games. In August 1937 he was given a free transfer from The Old Recreation Ground to Second Division club Southampton.

A very quick right-winger who could also play as a centre-forward, he arrived at The Dell to add depth to the Southampton forward line. Although he brought a wealth of experience with him, he spent most of his time in the reserves and in his two years on the south coast, he made only 19 first-team appearances, scoring twice. Following the outbreak of the Second World War his professional career ended and he retired from the game.

Career statistics
Source:

References

1908 births
1983 deaths
Footballers from Sunderland
English footballers
Association football wingers
Hylton Colliery Welfare F.C. players
Sunderland A.F.C. players
Nelson F.C. players
Huddersfield Town A.F.C. players
Charlton Athletic F.C. players
Chester City F.C. players
Port Vale F.C. players
Southampton F.C. players
English Football League players